Claussen House, also known as the Howard-Harllee-Claussen House, is a historic plantation house located at Florence, Florence County, South Carolina.  It was built about 1830, and is a raised cottage with early-19th century Greek Revival architecture and late-19th century Italianate style alterations and additions.  Also on the property are a contributing smoke house, gardener's cottage, hothouse/greenhouse, chicken coop/outhouse, and carriage shed.

It was listed on the National Register of Historic Places in 2001.

References

Plantation houses in South Carolina
Houses on the National Register of Historic Places in South Carolina
Greek Revival houses in South Carolina
Italianate architecture in South Carolina
Houses completed in 1830
Houses in Florence County, South Carolina
National Register of Historic Places in Florence County, South Carolina
Buildings and structures in Florence, South Carolina
1830 establishments in South Carolina